Events from the year 1111 in Ireland.

Incumbents
High King of Ireland: Domnall Ua Lochlainn

Events

Synod of Rathbreasail, presided over by Cellach Ua Sinaig, Abbot of Armagh is held. Ireland is divided into territorial dioceses (24 sees) under two metropolitans, the Archbishop of Armagh and the Archbishop of Cashel.
Domnall Ua Briain becomes King of the Hebrides and the Isle of Man, following a request from the people of that kingdom to the King of Munster to send them a ruler.

References